The 1978–79 Gillette Cup was the tenth season of official List A domestic cricket in Australia.  Six teams representing six states in Australia took part in the competition.  The competition began on 28 October 1978 when Queensland took on South Australia at the Gabba in Brisbane.

The 1978–79 Cup Final was played on 14 January 1979 at the TCA Ground in Hobart between Western Australia and Tasmania, who had been the finalists in the previous season as well. In a reversal of the previous season's result, Tasmania caused a major upset to win their first-ever domestic title by beating Western Australia by 47 runs.

Teams

Format
The 1978–79 Gillette Cup was not played in the round-robin format that would become popular in later seasons. Instead, the two finalists from the previous season, Western Australia (winners) and Tasmania (runners-up) progressed automatically to the semi-finals, whilst the four remaining states were randomly allocated an opponent in a knockout match.

Fixtures

Knock-out round

40 overs per side due to late start.

Semi-finals

Final

Statistics

Highest Team Totals

Most Runs

Highest Scores

Most Wickets

Best Bowling Figures

See also
 Sheffield Shield season 1978-79
 Australian cricket team in 1978-79

References

External links
 Cricket Web
 Cricket Australia
 Baggygreen

1978
1978–79 Australian cricket season
Domestic cricket competitions in 1978–79